Chris Pennie (born May 31, 1977) is an American musician who is the former drummer for the progressive rock band Coheed and Cambria and former drummer and co-founder of mathcore band The Dillinger Escape Plan.

Background
Pennie began playing drums at the age of 13, and at age 16 decided to pursue music seriously. He grew up in Randolph, New Jersey and graduated from Randolph High School, and spent two years at Berklee College of Music where he received a diploma in Music Synthesis, which focuses on electronic music composition and manipulation.

Influences and legacy
Pennie has cited drummers Lars Ulrich and Stewart Copeland as his main early influences. In regard to his current playing, Sean Reinert is one of his biggest inspirations. He has also emphasized on several occasions that listening to and playing a diverse assortment of music has been an integral part in developing his style, noting such eclectic influences as 1970s jazz-rock fusion group Mahavishnu Orchestra, technical metal bands Meshuggah, Cynic, and electronic-influenced groups such as Nine Inch Nails and DJ Shadow.

Many drummers have cited Pennie as an influence or expressed admiration for his work, including Brann Dailor, Richard Christy of Death, Peter Wildoer, Dave Witte, Tyshawn Sorey, Charlie Zeleny, Dan Searle of Architects, Andy Dalton of See You Next Tuesday, J. R. Conners of Cave In, Craig Reynolds of Stray from the Path, Jean-François Richard of Ion Dissonance, Andrew McEnaney of Structures, Tobias Persson of Visceral Bleeding, Stephen Carr of Exotic Animal Petting Zoo, Stefano Ghigliano of Stigma, Danny Grossarth of Candiria, Eric Schnee of Paria, Darren Pugh of Collibus, Eli Litwin of John Frum, Chris Golding of Sulaco and Corey Melom of The Crinn.

Bands
While in high school he was playing in the local New Jersey based band, Prozak. The other 3 members of Prozak were 8–10 years Pennie's senior, and in order for Prozak to play the local bars and clubs, Pennie's father would accompany him to the various gigs. Chris played with Prozak from 1993 until he began attending Berklee School of Music in 1995. He recorded ten songs with Prozak during his time with the band but they were never commercially released.

Pennie also spent time with the pop-punk group Boxer. Formed in 1995 with another Berklee graduate, Jeremy McDowell, they became the first band to be signed to the now famous Vagrant Records. They released one album, The Hurt Process, in 1998, and broke up in late 1999. Pennie also recorded drums for his former tourmates in experimental metalcore group All Else Failed on their 2004 album This Never Happened. Pennie describes his band, The Dillinger Escape Plan, as being 'mathcore' where they start each song with no structure and an open palette.

He and guitarist Ben Weinman, along with now-departed singer Dimitri Minakakis and bass guitarist Adam Doll, formed Dillinger Escape Plan in March 1997. He and Ben Weinman wrote the majority of Dillinger's material and Pennie called Weinman his "musical soulmate". Pennie also took care of a lot of the electronic influence in the band's material in the studio as well as onstage, triggering effects and loops with footswitch pedals.

Chris began working in the studio with rock band Coheed and Cambria, because the drummer Josh Eppard had left the band. Due to contractual obligations, Pennie was not allowed to record for Coheed's 2007 album Good Apollo, I'm Burning Star IV, Volume Two: No World for Tomorrow. Instead, the band recruited Foo Fighters drummer Taylor Hawkins for the task.  On June 28, 2007, Coheed and Cambria announced on their Myspace that Chris Pennie joined the band.

On November 2, 2011, Coheed and Cambria announced on their Facebook page that Pennie had left the band.  Chris also announced he had parted ways with Coheed and Cambria, in order to focus on other projects such as Return to Earth and Fight Mannequins.

Current projects

Pennie lent his talent to the predominantly electronic band Idiot Pilot on their 2007 album Wolves. MTV reported: "the Dillinger Escape Plan's Chris Pennie appears on the album, augmenting several of Wolves' tracks with his drumming prowess. Anderson said the one-two punches of Hoppus, Robinson, Barker, and Pennie are bringing something new to Idiot Pilot's established sound."

Equipment

Drums (Mapex Saturn Series in Black Cherry Sparkle finish):
20-inch × 22-inch bass drum
9-inch × 12-inch rack tom
16-inch × 16-inch floor tom
7-inch × 14-inch Mapex snare drum
Cymbals (Sabian):
14-inch HHX Groove hats
18-inch HHXplosion crash
19-inch HHXplosion crash
21-inch HH Raw Bell dry ride
19-inch Paragon Chinese
Sticks (Vater):
Vater Xtreme Design 5B
Bass Pedals (Mapex):
Mapex Falcon double bass pedal

Discography

With Dillinger Escape Plan
1997: The Dillinger Escape Plan
1998: Under the Running Board
1998: Split with Nora
1999: Split with Drowningman
1999: Calculating Infinity
2002: Irony Is A Dead Scene
2002: Black on Black: A Tribute to Black Flag – cover of "Damaged, Pt.s I & II"
2003: Cursed, Unshaven and Misbehavin': Live Infinity
2004: Bring You to Your Knees: A Tribute To Guns 'N Roses – cover of "My Michelle"
2004: Miss Machine
2005: We Reach: The Music of the Melvins – cover of "Honeybucket"
2006: Plagiarism
2019: Live Infinity

With Coheed and Cambria
2008: Kerrang – Maiden Heaven (Iron Maiden tribute record) – "The Trooper"
2009: Neverender: Children of The Fence Edition
2010: Year of the Black Rainbow

With Return to Earth
2007: Captains of Industry
2010: Automata
2022: Oblivion

Others
1998: Boxer – The Hurt Process
2005: Getaway Car – "Getaway Car" Mass Appeal
2004: All Else Failed – This Never Happened
2007: Idiot Pilot – Wolves
2010: The Armed – Common Enemies
2010: New World Man – A Tribute to Rush
2011: The Armed – Young & Beautiful
2012: The Armed – Spreading Joy
2016: Joseph A. Peragine – Diagnosis: Schizophrenia
2018: Joseph A. Peragine – Vol.2 (Diagnosis: Schizophrenia)
2018: Joseph A. Peragine – Vol.3 (Diagnosis: Schizophrenia)
2018: Joseph A. Peragine – Vol.4 (Diagnosis: Schizophrenia)
2020: Greg Puciato – Child Soldier: Creator of God (provided drums on "Creator of God" and "Fire For Water")

References

External links
Dillinger Escape Plan official site
Return to Earth official site
Vagrant Records official Boxer site
All Else Failed on MySpace
Interview with Chris Pennie by Ferrante's Power Equipment – Picture source
 Interview with Chris Pennie by The Drum Report
Interview with Chris Pennie by Empty Words
Interview with Chris Pennie by Silent Scream 
Interview with Boxer by Lollipop Magazine
 Sibelius – Software used to create musical example
Original 1993–1995 recordings with Decker, Holden, Pennie and Zuccolo
The Armed video Trailer with Chris Pennie

1977 births
Living people
American rock drummers
Coheed and Cambria members
The Dillinger Escape Plan members
Berklee College of Music alumni
People from Randolph, New Jersey
Randolph High School (New Jersey) alumni
20th-century American drummers
American male drummers
21st-century American drummers